Force the Hand of Chance is the debut studio album by English experimental group Psychic TV, released in 1982 by record label Some Bizzare. The first 5,000 pressings came with a bonus album, Themes.

A single, "Just Drifting", was released from the album.

Release 

Force the Hand of Chance was released in 1982. The initial 5,000 pressings included an additional album, Themes, and a poster. A single, "Just Drifting", was released from the album.

The album has a complex reissue history. In 1994, the Tempus Records label issued it on CD. Tempus retitled it Force Thee Hands ov Chants, packaged it with a completely different cover design (P-Orridge's 1980's collage "Twisted"), and credited it to Genesis P-Orridge and Psychic TV. The Tempus edition includes four bonus tracks and a second CD titled Blinded Eye in the Pyramids featuring music created by Genesis P-Orridge and Fred Giannelli in 1988.

It was again issued on CD by Cleopatra Records in 1995 with a different cover, bonus tracks taken from the Just Drifting 12-inch (the 7-inch B-side was not included) and the bonus 12-inch from the Dreams Less Sweet album, but missing all of the Themes LP. The sound quality was very poor and some tracks were remixed. A later reissue by Some Bizzare spread the same material (with the same flawed mastering) over two discs. A 2-CD set of the complete original 2-LP set was issued by WEA Japan.

The Themes LP has been issued on CD separately, first by Syard Records under the title Cold Dark Matter, remixed from the original master tapes and with an extra 3-minute spoken word coda added, then by Cleopatra Records under the title Themes Part One, mastered from an extremely noisy vinyl source, then by Syard Records yet again with a new cover and liner notes (identical audio to their initial release) and, most recently, by Cold Spring on their 7-CD Themes box set, remastered from the original tapes (original mix), but not including the coda from the Cold Dark Matter edition.

Reception 

Ned Raggett of AllMusic wrote "The first Psychic TV album in many ways remains its best". Trouser Press wrote "Force the Hand of Chance, regardless of its sincerity or utter lack thereof, is an amazing package [...] Musically, the main disc is a weird assortment of quiet ballads, screeching white noise, simple pop and more, with lyrics by P-Orridge that drift over terrain not all in keeping with the mystical concept. At times, form far outweighs function and some songs become merely effect without substance; others stand up nicely on their own regardless of the accompanying baggage. The adjunct record, Psychick TV Themes, uses real and imagined ethnic instruments from various exotic cultures to produce instrumentals that range from crazed to cool, intense to ephemeral". Head Heritage described it as "one of the two or three crucial PTV recordings".

Track listing

Original release

1994 CD version 

Track 13 is related to the 1993-1995 concept album project The Process by Skinny Puppy.

CD 2: All lyrics written/improvised by Genesis P-Orridge. All music written by Fred Giannelli and Genesis P-Orridge. Special guest on tracks 1 and 7, Bachir Attar, Master Musician of Jajouka.

Personnel 

 Psychic TV

 Peter Christopherson – keyboards, electronic percussion, tubular bells, vocals, production
 Alex Fergusson – lead, bass and acoustic guitars, tambourine, production
 Genesis P-Orridge – vocals, keyboards, real percussion, bass guitar, production

 Additional personnel
 David Tibet, Paula P-Orridge, Stan Bingo - instruments
 Kenny Wellington and Claude Deppa – brass on "Ov Power"
 Marc Almond – vocals on "Guiltless" and "Stolen Kisses"
 Mr Sebastian – vocals on "Message from the Temple"
 Andrew Poppy – string arrangements and conductor

 Technical

 Ken Thomas – production, engineering
 Craig Milliner – additional engineering
 Neville Brody - artwork

References

Further reading

External links 

 

Psychic TV albums
1982 debut albums
Some Bizzare Records albums